Eremophila cuneifolia, commonly known as pinyuru, is a flowering plant in the figwort family, Scrophulariaceae and is endemic to the north-west of Western Australia. It is a spreading, sticky shrub with wedge-shaped leaves, coloured sepals and usually deep purple flowers.

Description
They are thick and stiff and the top surface of the leaves is glabrous while the lower surface is hairy.

The petal tube is usually deep purple on the outside, sometimes paler, and white inside with purple spots. There are scattered hairs on the outside of the tube and on the lobes but the tube is filled with long, soft hairs. The four stamens are fully enclosed within the tube.

Taxonomy and naming
The species was first formally described by Friedrich Wilhelm Ludwig Kraenzlin in 1929 and the description was published in Repertorium Specierum Novarum Regni Vegetabilis Beihefte. The specific epithet (cuneifolia) is from the Latin words cuneus meaning "wedge" and folium meaning "a leaf".

Distribution
Pinyuru occurs between Leonora, Jigalong and Onslow in the Carnarvon, Little Sandy Desert, Central Ranges, Murchison, Pilbara and Gascoyne biogeographic regions. It grows in a range of soils and habitats, often in association with other Eremophila species and is sometimes the dominant plant species.

Conservation status
Eremophila cuneifolia is classified as "not threatened" by the Government of Western Australia Department of Parks and Wildlife.

Use in horticulture
This is one of the most attractive eremophilas in cultivation with its colourful sepals and deep purple flowers. It is not easy to propagate or to maintain, especially in areas like Sydney where the humidity is high. It is usually propagated by grafting onto Myoporum and needs a well-drained soil. Pinyuru is also frost sensitive and for this reason is probably best grown in a container which can be moved as the seasons change.

References

cuneifolia
Eudicots of Western Australia
Plants described in 1929
Endemic flora of Western Australia